Wilson Haledon Moses (8 April 1881 – 23 February 1953) was an Australian politician.

He was born in Paddington. He moved to Griffith in 1915, and was involved with the Griffith Producers' Co-operative Company from 1921 until 1935, when he resigned as its manager to take up a position as manager of Penfolds in Sydney. From 1932 to 1934 he was a Country Party member of the New South Wales Legislative Council. Later in life, he joined the Liberal Party, and served as vice-president of its Griffith branch. He died in Griffith in 1953.

References

1881 births
1953 deaths
National Party of Australia members of the Parliament of New South Wales
Members of the New South Wales Legislative Council
20th-century Australian politicians